Originally known as optimal subband tree structuring (SB-TS), also called wavelet packet decomposition (WPD)
(sometimes known as just wavelet packets or subband tree), is a wavelet transform where the discrete-time (sampled) signal is passed through more filters than the discrete wavelet transform (DWT).

Introduction 

In the DWT, each level is calculated by passing only the previous wavelet approximation coefficients (cAj) through discrete-time low- and high-pass quadrature mirror filters. However, in the WPD, both the detail (cDj (in the 1-D case), cHj, cVj, cDj (in the 2-D case)) and approximation coefficients are decomposed to create the full binary tree.

For n levels of decomposition the WPD produces 2n different sets of coefficients (or nodes) as opposed to  sets for the DWT. However, due to the downsampling process the overall number of coefficients is still the same and there is no redundancy.

From the point of view of compression, the standard wavelet transform may not produce the best result, since it is limited to wavelet bases that increase by a power of two towards the low frequencies. It could be that another combination of bases produce a more desirable representation for a particular signal. There are several algorithms for subband tree structuring that find a set of optimal bases that provide the most desirable representation of the data relative to a particular cost function (entropy, energy compaction, etc.). 

There were relevant studies in signal processing and communications fields to address the selection of subband trees (orthogonal basis) of various kinds, e.g. regular, dyadic, irregular, with respect to performance metrics of interest including energy compaction (entropy), subband correlations and others.

Discrete wavelet transform theory (continuous in the time variable) offers an approximation to transform discrete (sampled) signals. In contrast, the discrete-time subband transform theory enables a perfect representation of already sampled signals.

Gallery

Applications 

Wavelet packets were successfully applied in preclinical diagnosis.

References

External links 

 An implementation of wavelet packet decomposition can be found in MATLAB wavelet toolbox.
 An implementation for R can be found in the wavethresh package.
 An illustration and implementation of wavelet packets along with its code in C++ can be found at: 
 JWave: An implementation in Java for 1-D and 2-D wavelet packets using Haar, Daubechies, Coiflet, and Legendre wavelets.

Wavelets
Signal processing